Stanisław Gąsienica Sieczka (24 October 1904 – 10 October 1975) was a Polish ski jumper. He competed in the individual event at the 1928 Winter Olympics.

References

1904 births
1975 deaths
Polish male ski jumpers
Olympic ski jumpers of Poland
Ski jumpers at the 1928 Winter Olympics
Sportspeople from Zakopane